Sunil Godhwani is an Indian business executive who was associated with Religare from 2007 to 2018.

Godhwani was the Managing Director since April 9, 2007 and Chairman since April 6, 2010 of Religare. Since 2019, court proceedings have been in progress relative to the firm's management, and Godhwani was arrested on suspicion of fraud in June 2022.

He has participated in various business platforms such as the Confederation of Indian Industry (CII) and the Federation of Indian Chambers of Commerce & Industry (FICCI).

Early life and education
Godhwani was born on 10 December 1960 and raised in New Delhi, India, to a Sindhi family. He received a B.Sc. degree in chemical engineering and a M.Sc. in industrial engineering & finance from New York University Tandon School of Engineering.

References

-- (Commenting out these excessive citations. They weren't useful in that capacity, but if someone wants to use them to improve the article, or incorporate them as more appropriate citations, that would be great.-->

Polytechnic Institute of New York University alumni
Indian business executives
Living people
1960 births